The sixbar angelfish (Pomacanthus sexstriatus), also known as the six banded angelfish, is a species of marine ray-finned fish, a marine angelfish belonging to the family Pomacanthidae. It is found in Indo-Pacific region.

Description

The sixbar angelfish, like other members of the genus Pomacanthus, has juveniles and adults which look quite different. The juveniles have an overall blue black colour broken by many vertical white bands, the anterior bands being rather straight while the posterior bands become increasingly arced as they approach the tail. The adults have an overall colour of brownish-yellow on the body and the median fins, with vivid blue spots. Along the flanks there are 6 vertical bands, the first is whitish and is placed immediately behind the head, the following 5 are black. These angelfishes have 13-14 spines and 18-23 soft rays in the dorsal fin and 3 spines and 18-19 soft rays in the anal fin.

Distribution
The sixbar angelfish is found from Sri Lanka through the Male Archipelago to the Solomon Islands, north to the Ryukyu Islands of Southern Japan and Palau and south to New Caledonia and Australia. In Australia it extends from Shark Bay in Western Australia along the northern coast to the Capricorn and Bunker Group off Queensland. They are also found around the Rowley Shoals and Scott Reef of Western Australia, and Ashmore Reef in the Timor Sea.

Habitat and biology
The juveniles prefer sheltered inner reefs. when alarmed this species makes loud, grunting sounds. It is a carnivorous species which feeds on sponges and tunicates.

Systematics
The sixbar angelfish was first formally described as Holacanthus sexstriatus in 1831 by the French anatomist Georges Cuvier (1769–1832) with the type locality given as Java. Some authorities place this species in the subgenus Euxiphipops. The specific name sexstriatus means  “six banded”, a reference to the six vertical bands along its body.

Utilisation
The sixbar angelfish is occasionally collected for the aquarium trade but only the juveniles are suitable for home aquaria because the adults are too large.

References

External links
 iNaturalist
 Fishes of Australia

sixbar angelfish
Fish of Palau
sixbar angelfish
sixbar angelfish
Articles containing video clips